Ioana Strungaru (née Crăciun; born 4 January 1989) is a Romanian rower. She competed in the women's eight event at the 2016 Summer Olympics.

References

External links
 
 
 
 

1989 births
Living people
Romanian female rowers
World Rowing Championships medalists for Romania
Olympic rowers of Romania
Rowers at the 2016 Summer Olympics
Place of birth missing (living people)
Olympic bronze medalists for Romania
Medalists at the 2016 Summer Olympics
Olympic medalists in rowing
European Rowing Championships medalists